Cerithiopsis pulchresculpta is a species of sea snail, a gastropod in the family Cerithiopsidae. It was described by Cachia, Mifsud, and Sammut, 2004.

References

pulchresculpta
Gastropods described in 2004